Meïr Halevi (Max) Letteris (13 September 1800 – 19 May 1871) was an Austrian poet, editor, and translator of the Galician Haskala. He translated into Hebrew works by Virgil, Lucian, Jean Racine, Lord Byron, Johann Wolfgang von Goethe, Friedrich Schiller, Ludwig August von Frankl, and others.

Biography
Letteris was born in Zolkiev into a family of printers that came to Galicia from Amsterdam under John III Sobieski. His father Gershon also served as head of the town's Jewish community. At the age of twelve he sent a Hebrew poem to Nachman Krochmal, who was then living at Zolkiev. Subsequently he made the acquaintance of Krochmal, who encouraged him in his study of German, French, and Latin literature. 

In 1826, he entered the University of Lemberg, where for four years he studied philosophy and Oriental languages. In 1831, he went to Berlin as Hebrew corrector in a printing establishment, and later in a similar capacity to Presburg, where he edited a large number of valuable manuscripts, and to Prague, where he received the degree of Ph.D. (1844). In 1848 he settled finally in Vienna.

Work
Letteris' chief poetical work in German, Sagen aus dem Orient ('Legends of the Orient', Karlsruhe, 1847), consisting of poetic renderings of Talmudic and other legends, secured for him a gold medal from Emperor Franz Joseph and, though for a short time, the post of librarian in the Oriental department of the Vienna Imperial Library.

He exerted a considerable influence on Hebrew poetry. His reputation as the foremost poet of the Galician school is based on his volume of poems Tofes kinnor ve-'ugav ('Master of the Lyre and the Cithern', Vienna, 1860), and especially on his Hebrew version of Faust, entitled Ben Abuya (Vienna, 1865). In this work, Faust is replaced by the Jewish heretic Elisha ben Abuyah. (For the infidelity of his "translation" to Goethe's original, Letteris was the object of a blistering attack by the young Peretz Smolenskin.) One of his best known poems is his Zionist song Yonah Ḥomiyyah ('The Lamenting Dove'), became very popular.

He was the editor of Wiener Vierteljahrsschrift, with a Hebrew supplement, Abne Nezer (Vienna, 1853), and of Wiener Monatsblätter für Kunst und Litteratur (Vienna, 1853).

The Letteris Bible

In 1852, during a period in which he faced financial difficulties, he agreed to edit an edition of the Masoretic Text of the Hebrew Bible. In 1866 he produced a revised edition for a Christian missionary organization, the British and Foreign Bible Society. This revision was checked against old manuscripts and early printed editions. Its typeface is highly legible and it is printed in a clear single-column format per page. It is probably the most widely reproduced text of the Hebrew Bible in history, with many dozens of authorised reprints and many more pirated and unacknowledged ones.

This revised edition became very popular, and was widely reprinted in both Jewish circles (often accompanied by a translation on facing pages) and in Christian circles (with the addition of the New Testament).

Partial bibliography
 
 
  A selection of poems and essays.
  Poems.
  German translations from the Hebrew.
  Hebrew translation of Racine's Athalie.
  Hebrew translation of Racine's Esther.
 
 
  Hebrew rendering of Frankel's Nach der Zerstreuung.

References

External links

 

1800 births
1871 deaths
19th-century Austrian Jews
19th-century poets
Charles University alumni
English–Hebrew translators
French–Hebrew translators
Hebrew-language poets
Jews from Galicia (Eastern Europe)
Latin–Hebrew translators
Levites
People from Zhovkva
People of the Haskalah
University of Lviv alumni